Top 5 Restaurants is an American food-themed television series that aired on Food Network. The series was presented by chefs Sunny Anderson and Geoffrey Zakarian; and it featured the chefs counting down the top food items from across the United States that the network's "food experts" were able to find.

Episodes

Season 1 (2015)

Season 2 (2015–2016)

Season 3 (2016)

References

External links
 
 

2015 American television series debuts
2016 American television series endings
English-language television shows
Food Network original programming
Food reality television series
Television series by Authentic Entertainment